Vohitrambo is a town and commune in Madagascar. It belongs to the district of Vangaindrano, which is a part of Atsimo-Atsinanana Region. The population of the commune was estimated to be approximately 33,000 in 2001 commune census.

Primary and junior level secondary education are available in town. The majority 98% of the population of the commune are farmers.  The most important crop is coffee, while other important products are sugarcane, cassava and rice. Services provide employment for 2% of the population.

References and notes 

Populated places in Atsimo-Atsinanana